Rocroithys niveus is a species of sea snail, a marine gastropod mollusk in the family Raphitomidae.

Description
The shell reaches a length of 25.5 mm.

Distribution
This marine species occurs off Vanuatu, the Norfolk Ridge, New Hebrides.

References

External links
 MNHN, Paris: holotype
 

niveus
Gastropods described in 2001